The European Drag Racing Championship is a combination of four Drag Racing categories that have competed in six events since 1996. The European Drag Racing Season is held from May to September in four countries; UK, Sweden, Finland and Germany. Each drag race category pairs two drivers that compete against each other and the winner is the racer with the lowest reaction time and elapsed time over a designated destination. The drivers are adjudicated points for their performance at each stage which are tallied for a given season.

History

Champions 
Prior to 2006 the Pro Mod Champion was determined by the winner of the Nordic Drag Racing Series (NDRS), which is part of the Swedish Drag Racing Board.

Records

FIA Top Fuel Dragster (1000 feet) 
 Elapsed time: Ida Zetterstrom (FIN) at Santa Pod Raceway UK set a record time of 3.782 sec. in May, 2022
 Speed: Jndia Erbacher (SUI) at Tierp Arena Sweden set a record speed of 513.31 km/h 24 August 2019.
FIA Top Fuel Dragster (1/4 mile) (The FIA stopped running nitro races on the 1/4 mile from 2011)

 Elapsed Time: Andy Carter (GBR) at Santa Pod Raceway UK set a record time of 4.572 sec. in September, 2010
 Speed: Risto Poutiainen at Santa Pod Raceway UK set a record speed of 317.06mph/510.26km/h in May, 2011

FIA Top Methanol Dragster (1/4 mile) 

 Elapsed time: Tim Habersmann (GER) at Tierp Arena Sweden set a record time of 5.209 sec. in August, 2015.
 Speed: Chris Polidano (MLT) at Tierp Arena Sweden set a record speed of 278.45 mph / 448.13 km/h, in August 2014.

FIA Top Methanol Funny Car (1/4 mile) 

 Elapsed time: Jonnie Lindberg (SWE) at Santa Pod Raceway UK set a record time of 5.426 sec. in September, 2013.
 Speed: Jonnie Lindberg (SWE) at Tierp Arena Sweden set a record speed of 268.86 mph / 432.69 km/h, in August 2013.

FIA Pro Modified (1/4 mile) 

 Elapsed time: Jan Ericsson (SWE) at Santa Pod Raceway UK set a record time of 5.724 sec. in May, 2022.
 Speed: Tero Laukkanen (FIN) at Tierp Arena Sweden set a record speed of 260.11 mph / 418.60 km/h, in August 2015.

FIA Pro Stock Car (1/4 mile) 

 Elapsed time: Jimmy Ålund (SWE) at Tierp Arena Sweden set a record time of 6.485 sec. in August, 2019.
 Speed: Jimmy Ålund (SWE) at Tierp Arena Sweden set a record speed of 215.09 mph / 346.15 km/h, in June, 2015.

Racing

Categories 

 FIA Top Fuel Dragster (TF)
 FIA Top Methanol Dragster and Funny Car (TM)   
 FIA Pro Stock Car (PRO)
 FIA Pro Modified (PM) 

The European Drag Racing Championship began with five separate categories until 2017 when the Top Methanol Dragster and the Top Methanol Funny Car were combined. Top Methanol Dragster was previously called Top Alcohol Dragster and Top Methanol Funny Car was previously called Top Alcohol Funny Car.

Regulations

Drivers 
Anti-doping regulations are enforced, with each driver individually responsible for ensuring they know the most current regulations and that they comply. Each suit must comply with set regulations, including the inclusion of the FIA European Drag Racing Championship logo on their right hand chest area on the front of their suit. A minimum size of 8 centimetres by 8 centimetres must also be adhered to.

Cars 
Cars display each driver's name and national flag.  The FIA European Drag Racing Championship logo has to be exhibited on the side of each vehicle. A minimum size of 12 centimetres by 12 centimetres must also be adhered to and follow the placement structure:

 Dragsters: exterior, lower back corner of back wings spill plates
 Funny Cars: exterior, top back corner of back wings spills plates
 Pro Stock and Pro Modified: back quarter panel

It is also mandatory to display on the vehicle, the driver's FIA European Drag Racing Championship tournament number. An abbreviated code identifies not only the car owner, but the competition number also indicated the class of competition.

Drivers that rank top ten in the previous year's competition also display this rank on their vehicle in place of their race number or start number.

Safety Equipment 
The driver's self-protective gear is monitored by FIA along with drag car safety equipment. Drivers wear flame resistant suits for protection, heart rate technology  that allows monitoring of the drivers heart rate to prevent health concerns such as a heart attack, and helmets that are specified with headrest materials. The drag racing cars contain certified safety harnesses, air bags and parachutes. Single parachutes are recommended when drivers are exceeding 150 mph and double parachutes for speeds greater than 200 mph. Circuit safety equipment includes safety barriers, debris fences, and energy absorbing tyre barriers.

Qualifying to compete 
Drivers are required to pay a fee in order to be allowed to race in the Championships at least 30 days prior to events. This €800 (plus VAT) fee is payable to the Championship Administration and enables drivers to participate in every round of the Championship. Normal race entry fees also apply. Specific registrations fees are as follows:

Drivers from outside of Europe are not excluded from competing. All drivers are required to attain a FIA International Competition license specific to their drag category.

Race day 

Burn-outs take place prior to the commencement of the race, creating heat on the tire, improving friction. Cars then line up at the starting line, this is known as staging. An electronic set of lights, known as a christmas tree, indicate the commencement of the race. The lights consist of two small amber lights at the top which are connected to a light beam that travels down the track. As the front tires break this beam, the car moves to 180 millimetres from the starting line itself. When all racers are staged, the race begins as the green light is activated on the christmas tree. If the drivers begin before the illumination of the christmas tree green light they are disqualified, and a red light is used to indicate the early start. Disqualifications also occur when a driver crosses the centre line on the race track between lanes, contacts a wall or track fixture, unsuccessful attendance or fails technical inspection. The maximum speed, reaction time and elapsed time are recorded for each race. The reaction time is a measure of the drivers take off after the illumination of the christmas tree green light. The time taken for the vehicle to travel from the start line to the finish is the elapsed time. The first driver to reach the finish line wins the race.

Point system 
Points are awarded in two ways:

 From the qualifying events that enable participants to proceed to the elimination rounds, and
 From the elimination rounds that take place after the qualifying events.

The number of elimination rounds are determined by the number of cars in each event. The following table shows the current allocation for points in each round: Elimination Round Points are awarded:

10 points are also awarded to each contestant that qualify in one run. Qualifying Position Points are awarded:

In 2013 points were introduced for the fastest three elapsed times in qualify rounds.

To break a tie, three steps take place:

 The full season of racing is reviewed, with the driver with the most head to head victories winning the tie.
 The full season of elimination racing is reviewed, with the driver who has won the most rounded winning the tie.
 Tie-breaks points for the full season of event to be applied, with the highest point scorer winning the tie.

Postponed Events 
An event is classed as postponed if a portion of the event has to be rescheduled for any reason. If events are rescheduled, participants that have qualified but are unable to return will be permitted to automatically withdraw, receiving zero points. Participants that do not wish to be withdrawn must contact the Event Director or Clerk of the Course in order to receive any points that were earned up until the time of postponement.

Suspended Events 
If any event is suspended prior to any qualifying race taking place, each participant that passed the tech inspection will be allocated 10 points.

If a qualifying event has taken place and subsequently the event is suspended, only points for the qualifying round and first round will be awarded. Any participant who did not qualify will receive zero points. All point allocations will adhere to the regulations of the FIA Drag Racing Championship.

During an elimination round, if an event is suspended, all participants that had not been eliminated at the commencement of that round will be allocated loser points for that round, as per the points table.

Points Rules 

 Points are non-transferable from participant to participant.
 After qualifying ends, Low Elapsed Time attempts will not be allowed.
 Low Elapsed Times will be allowed on the final run of a participant prior to elimination.
 Participants whose cars have been damaged beyond repair will be given the option to leave the event prior to elimination, at the discretion of the event Steward, while maintaining points and financial awards.

Alternates 
Ladders will be established at the end of qualification events. After this, pairings are unable to be changed. If a participate is unable to make the elimination first round, the fastest non-qualifier will be put in place as an alternate. Points and financial awards earned by the participant in the first round will still be awarded to the original qualifier. The original qualifier must be on the race track premises, along with the car at the commencement of the first round. The awards will be otherwise deducted, and the alternate will be given the round points and financial awards.

Race Tracks 
The European Drag Racing Championship consists of six championship events across four host countries:

 Santa Pod Raceway in the UK
 Tierp Arena in Sweden
 Alastaro Circuit in Finland
 Hockenheim Ring in Germany

Commencing in May at Santa Pod, and concluding with the finals annually in September in the same location. Traditionally, the second and fifth stages are held in Tierp Arena and the third and fourth stages in Alastaro Circuit and Hockenheim Ring. The races take place on a track known as the drag strip. Before the drag strip a feature referred to as a 'water box' is used by the racers to do burnouts. The typical distance of a drag strip is a quarter of a mile, 1320 feet/402 metres. A shut down area exists immediately after the finishing line enabling the vehicles to stop in a room designed especially for that task.

Season Schedules 
2018

 Round 1 - Santa Pod Raceway, UK, 25–28 May
 Round 2 - Tierp Arena, Sweden, 7–10 June
 Round 3 - Alastaro, Finland, 28 June – 1 July
 Round 4 - HockenheimRing, Germany, 17–19 August
 Round 5 - Tierp Arena, Sweden, 23–26 August
 Round 6 - FIA European Finals, Santa Pod Raceway, UK, 6–19 September

2017

 Round 1 - Santa Pod Raceway, UK, 26–29 May
 Round 2 - Tierp Arena, Sweden, 15–18 June
 Round 3 - Alastaro, Finland, 29 June – 2 July
 Round 4 - HockenheimRing, Germany, 18–20 August
 Round 5 - Tierp Arena, Sweden, 24–27 August
 Round 6 - FIA European Finals, Santa Pod Raceway, UK, 8–10 September

2016

 Round 1 - Santa Pod Raceway, UK, 27–30 May
 Round 2 - Tierp Arena, Sweden, 16–19 June
 Round 3 - Alastaro, Finland, 7–10 July
 Round 4 - HockenheimRing, Germany, 19–21 August
 Round 5 - Tierp Arena, Sweden, 25–28 August
 Round 6 - FIA European Finals, Santa Pod Raceway, UK, 9–11 September

2015

 Round 1 - Santa Pod Raceway, UK, 22–25 May
 Round 2 - Tierp Arena, Sweden, 4–7 June
 Round 3 - Alastaro, Finland, 2–5 July
 Round 4 - HockenheimRing, Germany, 7–9 August
 Round 5 - Tierp Arena, Sweden, 20–23 August
 Round 6 - FIA European Finals, Santa Pod Raceway, UK, 3–6 September

2014

 Round 1 - Santa Pod Raceway, UK, 23–26 May
 Round 2 - Alastaro, Finland, 3–6 July
 Round 3 - HockenheimRing, Germany, 8–10 August
 Round 4 - Tierp Arena, Sweden, 21–24 August
 Round 5 - FIA European Finals, Santa Pod Raceway, UK, 4–7 September

2013

 Round 1 - Santa Pod Raceway, UK, 24–27 May
 Round 2 - Tierp Arena, Sweden, 13–16 June
 Round 3 - Alastaro, Finland, 4–7 July
 Round 4 - HockenheimRing, Germany, 9–11 August
 Round 5 - Tierp Arena, Sweden, 22–25 August
 Round 6 - FIA European Finals, Santa Pod Raceway, UK, 5–8 September

2012

 Round 1 - Santa Pod Raceway, UK, 2–4 June
 Round 2 - Tierp Arena, Sweden, 14–17 June
 Round 3 - Alastaro, Finland, 5–8 July
 Round 4 - Tierp Arena, Sweden, 23–26 August
 Round 5 - FIA European Finals, Santa Pod Raceway, UK, 6–9 September

NOTE:  Hockenheimring (10-12 August) was cancelled after officials had issues with the track after all track prep was removed under FIA requests because the launch pad area is part of the runoff at the road course used by Formula One in July.

From 2012, the European Drag Racing Championship consisted of 6 rounds.

2011

 Round 1 - Santa Pod Raceway, UK, 27–30 May
 Round 2 - Tierp Arena, Sweden, 10–12 June
 Round 3 - Alastaro, Finland, 30 June - 3 July
 Round 4 - HockenheimRing, Germany, 12–14 August
 Round 5 - FIA European Finals, Santa Pod Raceway, UK, 8–11 September

2010

 Round 1 - Santa Pod Raceway, UK, 28–31 May
 Round 2 - Alastaro, Finland, 1–4 July
 Round 3 - Mantorp Park, Sweden, 29–1 August
 Round 4 - HockenheimRing, Germany, 13–15 August
 Round 5 - FIA European Finals, Santa Pod Raceway, UK, 9–12 September

See also 

 FIA
 List of FIA events
 Drag Racing
 DragStrip
 Drag Racing Venues in Europe

References 

Drag racing events